The Molise regional election of 2001 took place on 11 November 2001. It was an early election as the 2000 regional election was invalidated due to irregularities in the vote.

The election consisted in a re-proposition of the 2000 race, but this time Michele Iorio (Forza Italia) defeated incumbent Giovanni Di Stasi (Democrats of the Left) by a landslide.

Results

Source: Ministry of the Interior

Elections in Molise
2001 elections in Italy
November 2001 events in Europe